is a town located at the southern tip of Izu Peninsula in Kamo District, Shizuoka Prefecture, Japan. ,  the town had an estimated population of 8,231 in 3895 households, and a population density of 74 persons per km². The total area of the town is

Geography
Minamiizu occupies the southern tip of Izu Peninsula, a hilly region with an indented ria coastline facing the Philippine Sea of the Pacific Ocean. The area has numerous hot springs. Warmed by the warm Kuroshio Current, the area enjoys a warm maritime climate with hot, humid summers and mild, cool winters. Parts of the town are within the borders of Fuji-Hakone-Izu National Park, and the historic Irōzaki Lighthouse is located at the tip of Cape Irōzaki, to the south of town.

Neighboring municipalities
Shizuoka Prefecture
Shimoda
Matsuzaki

Climate
The city has a climate characterized by hot and humid summers, and relatively mild winters (Köppen climate classification Cfa).  The average annual temperature in Minamiizu is 16.3 °C. The average annual rainfall is 2028 mm with September as the wettest month. The temperatures are highest on average in August, at around 26.1 °C, and lowest in January, at around 7.3 °C.

Demographics
Per Japanese census data, the population of Minamiizu has been in decline over the past 60 years.

History
During the Edo period, all of Izu Province was tenryō territory under direct control of the Tokugawa shogunate, and the area now comprising Minamiizu Town consisted of 25 villages. With the establishment of the modern municipalities system of the early Meiji period in 1889, the area was reorganized into six villages (Minamizaka, Minaminaka, Minamikami, Mizaka, Mihama and Chikuma) within Kamo District. The town of Minamiizu was formed in July 1955 through the merger of these six villages.

Around March 31, 2010, the city of Shimoda and three municipalities in Kamo District (Kawazu, Matsuzaki, and Minamiizu) were scheduled to merge. However, the merger backed out.

Economy
Tourism based on water sports and the hot spring industry, commercial fishing and farming are mainstays of the local economy.

Education
Minamiizu has three public elementary schools and two public junior high schools operated by the town government. The town has one public high school operated by the Shizuoka Prefectural Board of Education.

Transportation

Railway
Minamiizu does not have any passenger railway service

Highway

References

External links

Minamiizu official website (Japanese)

Towns in Shizuoka Prefecture
Populated coastal places in Japan
Minamiizu, Shizuoka